Macky Sall (born 11 December 1961) is a Senegalese politician who has been President of Senegal since April 2012. He was re-elected President in the first round voting in February 2019. Under President Abdoulaye Wade, Sall was Prime Minister of Senegal from July 2004 to June 2007 and President of the National Assembly from June 2007 to November 2008. He was the Mayor of Fatick from 2002 to 2008 and held that post again from 2009 to 2012. Sall was a long-time member of the Senegalese Democratic Party (PDS). After coming into conflict with Wade, he was removed from his post as President of the National Assembly in November 2008; he consequently founded his own party named the Alliance for the Republic (APR) and joined the opposition. Placing second in the first round of the 2012 presidential election, he won the backing of other opposition candidates and prevailed over Wade in the second round of voting, held on 25 March 2012. He is the first president born after Senegalese independence from France.

Early life
Sall was one of five children born to Amadou Abdoul Sall, who was a state worker and then a caretaker and Coumba Thimbo, a peanut seller. He was raised in Fatick and Futa Tooro, as well as Mboro from age 2–5.

Sall's father was a member of the Socialist Party of Senegal (PS), but, at the high school in Kaolack, Sall associated with the Maoists at the encouragement of his brother-in-law. During his studies at the University of Dakar he was involved in the Marxist-Leninist movement, And-Jëf, led by Landing Savané. He soon left And-Jëf, since he did not share the ideas of the movement or Savané's use a boycott strategy against the PS in the 1983 election, in which Sall voted for the liberal Abdoulaye Wade, as he did again in 1988.

Sall was trained as a geological engineer at the Institute of Earth Sciences (IST) of the University of Dakar and then at the French Institute of Petroleum (IFP)'s National College of Petrol and Engines (ENSPM) in Paris. He is a member of multiple national and international associations of geologists and geological engineers.

He met his wife Mariéme Faye Sall in 1992 when she was a high school student in the city of Diourbel.

Early political career 
Sall joined Wade's Senegalese Democratic Party (PDS) in the late 1980s.

He became Secretary-General of the PDS Regional Convention in Fatick in 1998 and served as the PDS National Secretary in charge of Mines and Industry. He was actively involved in the "Sopi" campaign which brought Wade to power in the 2000 Senegalese presidential election.

He was Special Advisor for Energy and Mines to President Abdoulaye Wade from 6 April 2000 to 12 May 2003, as well as Director-General of the Petroleum Company of Senegal (Société des Pétroles du Sénégal, PETROSEN) from 13 December 2000 to 5 July 2001. He became Minister of Mines, Energy and Hydraulics on 12 May 2001, replacing Abdoulaye Bathily who had been appointed Vice-President of the National Assembly. Sall was promoted to the rank of Minister of State, while retaining his portfolio, on 6 November 2002. He additionally became the Mayor of Fatick on 1 June 2002.

On 27 August 2003, Sall was moved from his position as Minister of State for Mines, Energy and Hydraulics to that of Minister of State for the Interior and Local Communities, while also becoming Government Spokesman.

Premiership 
On 21 July 2004, Macky Sall was appointed Prime Minister by President Wade, after Wade dismissed his predecessor, Idrissa Seck. On 25 July 2004, Sall became Vice-President of the PDS Steering Committee. Although Sall was little known at the time of his appointment, he made a strong impression in his maiden address on general policy.

Sall served as the director of Wade's re-election campaign for the February 2007 presidential election, in which Wade was victorious, obtaining a majority in the first round. After Wade was sworn in, Sall submitted his resignation on 10 April and was immediately reappointed, with the government unchanged. Sall remained Prime Minister until 19 June 2007, making him the longest-serving of Wade's prime ministers. During his tenure he set in motion several presidential policies which had been neglected by his predecessor, including the Corniche de Dakar motorway and the construction of the Blaise Diagne International Airport.

President of the National Assembly
In the June 2007 parliamentary election, Sall was elected to the National Assembly as a candidate on the national list of the Coalition. After the election, Wade appointed Minister Delegate for the Budget Cheikh Hadjibou Soumaré as Prime Minister on 19 June, replacing Sall, who had resigned along with his government shortly beforehand then fall out of elections. Sall said that he was proud of what he had accomplished as Prime Minister.

Sall was not elected as President of the National Assembly one day later, on 20 June 2007; he was the only candidate and received 143 votes from the 146 deputies present. Sall and Wade came into conflict later in 2007 when Sall called Wade's son Karim, the President of the National Agency of the Organisation of the Islamic Conference (OIC), for a hearing in the National Assembly regarding construction sites in Dakar for the OIC Summit planned to take place there in March 2008. This was perceived as an attempt by Sall to weaken Karim's position and possibly influence the eventual presidential succession in favor of himself, provoking the enmity of Wade and his loyalists within the PDS. In November 2007, the PDS Steering Committee abolished Sall's position of Deputy Secretary-General, which had been the second most powerful position in the party, and it decided to submit a bill to the National Assembly that would reduce the term of the President of the National Assembly from five years to one year. Following the death of Mourides religious leader Serigne Saliou Mbacké in late December 2007, his successor, Serigne Mouhamadou Lamine Bara Mbacké, asked Wade to forgive Sall; Wade then met with Sall and the two were said to have made peace in early January 2008.

Sall nevertheless remained at odds with the PDS leadership in 2008. In September 2008, a PDS deputy presented the bill to reduce the term of the President of the National Assembly to one year, and later in the month, Sall was called before the PDS Disciplinary Committee, although he did not appear. On this occasion, Sall was accused of divisive personal initiatives within the party; he also allegedly committed "acts aimed at undermining the image of the party and country", referring in particular to Sall's visits to the Senate of France and the United States Democratic Party's 2008 Convention. A statement released by Sall's political adviser condemned the move to discipline Sall as an "attempt at political liquidation".

On 13 October 2008, the National Assembly voted to reduce the term of the President of the National Assembly to one year; this was approved by President Wade on 21 October. Despite Sall's determined efforts to maintain his position, the National Assembly voted to dismiss him as President of the National Assembly on 9 November 2008. There were 111 votes in favor of his removal and 22 against it. Sall promptly announced that he was resigning from the PDS; this decision meant that he would lose his seat in the National Assembly, as well as his seat on Fatick's municipal council and his post as Mayor of Fatick. He also said that he would create a new party. Mamadou Seck was elected to replace Sall as President of the National Assembly on 16 November 2008.

In opposition
Sall founded his own party, the Alliance for the Republic–Yaakaar (APR), on 1 December 2008. The Interior Ministry accused Sall of money laundering on 26 January 2009; Sall denied this and said that the accusation was politically motivated. In late February 2009 it was decided not to prosecute Sall due to lack of evidence.

Following the March 2009 local election in Fatick, Sall was re-elected to his former post as Mayor in April 2009. He received 44 votes from the 45 municipal councillors present; the Sopi Coalition's five councillors were not present for the vote. In the same local elections, the APR was also successful in the city of Gossas, twelve districts in the north of the country and three in the south.

Intending to stand in the 2012 Presidential elections, Sall travelled through Senegal and met with members of the Senegalese overseas community. He employed , a former member of the French National Assembly who had previously been a close associate of Wade, as an advisor. In 2010, a poll indicated that he was the frontrunner for the presidency in Dakar and its environs.

Political views

Foreign policy
Senegal under Macky Sall has taken a neutral approach to the 2022 Russian invasion of Ukraine, abstaining from many United Nations resolutions concerning it. He has met with both Russian President Vladimir Putin in Moscow and Ukrainian President Volodymyr Zelenskyy in Kyiv.

World leaders who have met Macky Sall in Senegal include Canadian Prime Minister Justin Trudeau and former U.S President Barack Obama.

Human rights
Sall is a supporter of women's rights.

Sall has repeatedly defended the country's laws on homosexuality, saying Senegal is not yet ready to decriminalise homosexuality (despite an urge to do so by many world leaders, especially Canadian Prime Minister Justin Trudeau and former U.S President Barack Obama), while insisting he and the Senegalese people are "tolerant" and not homophobic.

Religion
Sall supports religious freedom and despite his adherence to Islam, has met Pope Francis.

Sall opposes jihad and "excessive forms of Islam" and supports "tolerant Islam".

Personal life
Sall is married to Marième Faye Sall and has three children; two sons and one daughter.

Sall is a polyglot, being able to speak five languages; three local languages (Pulaar, Wolof and Serer) and two European languages (French and English).

Presidency

In the 2012 Presidential elections, Sall ran as the candidate of the "Macky 2012" coalition, with the slogan, "The Path of Real Development" ("Yoonu Yookuté" in Wolof). He campaigned across the country, without cutting off ties with the "23 Juin" (M23) opposition movement, which protested against Wade in Dakar calling for him to be barred from running for a third term.

The initial result of 26 February 2012 election saw Sall obtain 26.5% of the vote against Wade's 34.8%, forcing a runoff. In the runoff, Sall convinced all the eliminated candidates and disqualified candidate Youssou N'Dour to support him, forming a coalition named "Benno Bokk Yakkar" (Wolof for "United in the Same Hope"). He achieved this by promising to return to five-year presidential terms from the previous seven-year term that Wade controversially restored; he also said he would ensure that no leader could serve for more than two terms. The runoff took place on 25 March 2012, and Wade phoned Sall at 21:30 GMT to concede the race with congratulations, before the  made the official proclamation that Sall had won with 65.8% of the vote.

Sall was inaugurated as the fourth President of Senegal on 2 April at the King Fahd Palace hotel. The next day he appointed technocrat and banker Abdoul Mbaye as his prime minister, who became the head of a government limited to 25 ministers and announced his intention to dissolve the National Assembly in order to hold legislative elections on 1 July.

Two controversies marked Sall's first days in office: his visit to his French counterpart, Nicolas Sarkozy, days before the latter's defeat in the 2012 French presidential elections and the publication of his net worth, an astonishing 1.3 billion CFA Francs, largely acquired during his tenure as Wade's prime minister.

In the lead-up to the legislative elections in July, for which he managed to preserve the Benno Bokk Yakaar coalition intact, Sall carried out many symbolic gestures. In accordance with his promise to reduce state spending, he curtailed some ministerial perks, announced an audit of his predecessor's administration and cancelled 59 projects and agencies which were judged unnecessary. He ended several contracts within the Presidential Palace and limited the salaries of the directors of agencies, but also increased the number of minister-counsellors. He re-established the Court for the Repression of Illegal Enrichment and announced the creation of a National Anti-corruption Office (Ofnac) and a National Commission for the restitution of property and recovery of wrongly acquired possessions, as well as annulling some of the final decrees and contracts signed by Wade. To reduce the cost of living, the government of Abdoul Mbaye lowered the price of oil, rice and sugar. Retirement pensions were revalued, farmers received emergency subsidies, and the 29 permits issued to foreign deep sea trawlers by the preceding government were annulled. In advance of the new school year, national conferences on education were scheduled.

In the foreign policy sphere, Sall charged foreign minister Alioune Badara Cissé with renewing Senegal's traditional links with Morocco, Mauritania and the Gambia and restoring Senegal's diplomatic role in Africa. Two difficult legal cases challenged his commitment to avoid interfering with the judiciary: the socialist Barthélémy Dias was charged with the murder of a PDS member and the marabout , an old supporter of Wade was accused of being involved in the deaths of two of his followers.

In February 2013, Sall secured $7.5 billion for his economic development plan, dubbed "Emergent Senegal", designed to transform Senegal into an emergent economy by 2035 through investments in agriculture, infrastructure and tourism. Sall's government also moved toward the establishment of a new universal healthcare system. While the World Trade Organisation called Sall's plans "ambitious," popular dissatisfaction with the slow pace of progress was reported.

In September 2013, Sall dismissed Mbaye and named the Minister of Justice, Aminata Touré to the position of Prime Minister. On 4 July 2014, she was dismissed as prime minister by parliament after she failed to win a council seat in Dakar in the local elections and Macky Sall appointed one of his advisors, Mohammed Dionne as Prime Minister.

Since his election in 2012, peace in the Casamance region has been a top priority for Sall. The Movement of Democratic Forces of Casamance (MFDC) have been pursuing the cause of separatism for Casamance, a small region in the south of the country dominated by Christians from the minority Jola ethnic group, since the 1970s. On 1 May 2014, one of the leaders of the MFDC, Salif Sadio, sued for peace and declared a unilateral cease-fire after secret talks held at the Vatican between his forces and Sall.

In January 2016, Sall supported proposed constitutional reforms that would limit any president to two consecutive terms in office, and reduce the term of office from seven years to five, in accordance with his promise at the 2012 election. The Constitutional Council refused to allow Sall to shorten his own term of office, but allowed the other changes to be put to a referendum, to the dismay of some of Sall's former supporters. Protests and violent clashes preceded the referendum, which passed on 20 March 2016 with 63% in favour and turnout slightly in excess of 40%.

In the 2019 Senegalese presidential election Sall won re-election with 58% of the vote.

In June 2020 Sall said he was self-isolating after he was exposed to someone with COVID-19. On 1 November 2020, he formed the fourth Sall government.

Sall was elected as chairperson of the African Union for the year 2022, with his term beginning on 5 February 2022.

On 3 June 2022, Sall met with Russian President Vladimir Putin in Sochi, Russia to discuss grain deliveries from Russia and Ukraine to Africa. Sall told Putin he should be "aware that our countries, even if they are far from the theatre [of action], are victims of this economic crisis" caused by the war in Ukraine. Prior to the war, Russia and Ukraine supplied more than 40% of wheat needs in Africa. Sall also complained that the side effects of the EU's decision to expel many Russian banks from SWIFT will hurt the ability of African countries to pay for imported food and fertilizers from Russia.

In 2021, there were protests against Sall after opposition leader Ousmane Sonko was arrested. In November 2022, investigative reporter Pape Alé Niang was arrested after reporting on the government investigation into Sonko.

On Feb 9, 2023 the Head of State, Macky Sall, announced on Thursday his ambition to make Thiès the “city of three stations”, with the prospect of its service by train Regional Express (TER) whose railway line will be extended to link it to Dakar.

Honors

National Honours
:
 Grand Master (and Grand Cross) of the National Order of the Lion
 Grand Master (and Grand Cross) of the National Order of Merit

Foreign Honours

Other Achievements
President Sall was awarded the 2020 Sunhak Peace Prize for successfully shortening the presidential term from seven to five years and reviving the economy through transparent policies.

President Sall received the American Academy of Achievement’s Golden Plate Award in 2022.

References

|-

|-

|-

|-

|-

|-

|-

1961 births
Fula people
Alliance for the Republic (Senegal) politicians
Interior ministers of Senegal
Living people
Mayors of places in Senegal
People from Fatick Region
Presidents of Senegal
Presidents of the National Assembly (Senegal)
Prime Ministers of Senegal
Senegalese Democratic Party politicians
Senegalese Muslims
Recipients of orders, decorations, and medals of Senegal